Lama bint Turki Al Saud is an amateur jumper who represents Saudi Arabia in various equestrian competitions. She is a member of the Saudi royal family, and her parents are Prince Turki bin Nasser and Princess Noura bint Sultan.

Lama bint Turki has stakes in different Saudi companies, including Al Karakat company, Majd Trading and Contracting and Sana Al Fajr and Operation.

References

Lama
Lama
Lama
Lama
Living people
Lama
Lama
Lama
Year of birth missing (living people)